The Thief of Bagdad is a 1952 West German musical comedy film directed by Karel Lamac and starring Theo Lingen, Paul Kemp, Sonja Ziemann and Rudolf Prack. It is not a remake of the 1940 film of the same name, but a comedy about the magic tricks of a female thief in Old Baghdad. It was filmed at the Bendestorf Studios in Lower Saxony. The film's sets were designed by the art directors Heinrich Beisenherz and Alfred Bütow.

Cast

References

Bibliography

External links
 

1952 films
West German films
1952 musical comedy films
1950s fantasy comedy films
German musical comedy films
German fantasy comedy films
1950s German-language films
Films directed by Karel Lamač
Films based on The Thief of Bagdad
1950s historical comedy films
German historical comedy films
Films set in Baghdad
German historical fantasy films
1950s historical musical films
German historical musical films
German black-and-white films
Fictional caliphs
1950s German films